Carl Ericson (born September 11, 1996) is a Swedish ice hockey player. He is currently playing with Leksands IF of the Swedish Hockey League (SHL).

Ericson made his Swedish Hockey League debut playing with Leksands IF during the 2014–15 SHL season. He was then drafted by the Portland Winterhawks in the 2015 Canadian Hockey League Import Draft and signed a contract with them for the 2015–16 season. However, Ericson was limited to three games due to an injury.

References

External links

1996 births
Living people
Leksands IF players
Swedish ice hockey centres